The Corsican Donkey, is a breed of domestic donkey from the Mediterranean island of Corsica, a région and territorial collectivity of France. It is not recognised by the Ministère de l'agriculture, de l'agroalimentaire et de la forêt, the French ministry of agriculture, or by the Haras Nationaux, the French national stud; nor is it reported to the DAD-IS database of the FAO. Its numbers have fallen alarmingly; two associations are seeking its official recognition as a breed.

History 

The indigenous Corsican donkey is small and usually grey, and it is thought to have been present on the island since Roman times. In modern times attempts have been made to increase its size by cross-breeding with imported stock including the Catalan donkey from Spain, donkeys from the French mainland, and the Martina Franca donkey from Puglia in Italy. A larger black type of donkey, standing  has developed.
 
Before the mechanisation of transport and agriculture in the 1930s there were more than 20,000 donkeys in Corsica. Until the 1960s large numbers were sold at miserable prices to the meat markets of Italy and mainland France; there is no tradition of eating donkey meat in Corsica, and the recent appearance of donkey salami in shops there is a consequence of tourist demand.

The current population of the Corsican Donkey is estimated at about 1000; its conservation status was listed as "critical" by the SAVE Foundation in 2008. Two associations, A Runcata ("the bray") and Isul'âne, have been formed for its protection, and the first steps towards seeking official recognition for the breed were taken in 2010.

References 

Donkey breeds
Donkey breeds originating in France
Fauna of Corsica